Biogenic sulfide corrosion is a bacterially mediated process of forming hydrogen sulfide gas and the subsequent conversion to sulfuric acid that attacks concrete and steel within wastewater environments.  The hydrogen sulfide gas is biochemically oxidized in the presence of moisture to form sulfuric acid.  The effect of sulfuric acid on concrete and steel surfaces exposed to severe wastewater environments can be devastating. In the USA alone, corrosion is causing sewer asset losses estimated at
around $14 billion per year. This cost is expected to increase as the aging infrastructure continues to fail.

Environment
Corrosion may occur where stale sewage generates hydrogen sulfide gas into an atmosphere containing oxygen gas and high relative humidity.  There must be an underlying anaerobic aquatic habitat containing sulfates and an overlying aerobic aquatic habitat separated by a gas phase containing both oxygen and hydrogen sulfide at concentrations in excess of 2 ppm.

Conversion of sulfate SO42− to hydrogen sulfide H2S
Fresh domestic sewage entering a wastewater collection system contains proteins including organic sulfur compounds oxidizable to sulfates and may contain inorganic sulfates.  Dissolved oxygen is depleted as bacteria begin to catabolize organic material in sewage.  In the absence of dissolved oxygen and nitrates, sulfates are reduced to hydrogen sulfide as an alternative source of oxygen for catabolizing organic waste by sulfate reducing bacteria (SRB), identified primarily from the obligate anaerobic species Desulfovibrio.

Hydrogen sulfide production depends on various physicochemical, topographic and hydraulic parameters such as:
 Sewage oxygen concentration. The threshold is 0.1 mg.l−1; above this value, sulfides produced in sludge and sediments are oxidized by oxygen; below this value, sulfides are emitted in the gaseous phase.
 Temperature. The higher the temperature, the faster the kinetics of H2S production.
 Sewage pH. It must be included between 5.5 and 9 with an optimum at 7.5-8.
 Sulfate concentration.
 Nutrients concentration, associated to the biochemical oxygen demand.
 Conception of the sewage As H2S is formed only in anaerobic conditions. Slow flow and long retention time gives more time to aerobic bacteria to consume all available dissolved oxygen in water, creating anaerobic conditions. The flatter the land, the less slope can be given to the sewer network, and this favors slower flow and more pumping stations (where retention time is generally longer)

Conversion of hydrogen sulfide to sulfuric acid  H2SO4
Some hydrogen sulfide gas diffuses into the headspace environment above the wastewater.  Moisture evaporated from warm sewage may condense on unsubmerged walls of sewers, and is likely to hang in partially formed droplets from the horizontal crown of the sewer.  As a portion of the hydrogen sulfide gas and oxygen gas from the air above the sewage dissolves into these stationary droplets, they become a habitat for sulfur oxidizing bacteria (SOB), of the genus Acidithiobacillus.  Colonies of these aerobic bacteria metabolize the hydrogen sulfide gas to sulfuric acid.

Corrosion

Sulfuric acid produced by microorganisms will interact with the surface of the structure material. For ordinary Portland cement, it reacts with the calcium hydroxide in concrete to form calcium sulfate. This change simultaneously destroys the polymeric nature of calcium hydroxide and substitutes a larger molecule into the matrix causing pressure and spalling of the adjacent concrete and aggregate particles.  The weakened crown may then collapse under heavy overburden loads. Even within a well-designed sewer network, a rule of thumb in the industry suggests that 5% of the total length may/will suffer from biogenic corrosion. In these specific areas, biogenic sulfide corrosion can deteriorate metal or several millimeters per year of concrete (see Table).

For calcium aluminate cements, processes are completely different because they are based on another chemical composition. At least three different mechanisms contribute to the better resistance to biogenic corrosion:
 The first barrier is the larger acid neutralizing capacity of calcium aluminate cements vs. ordinary Portland Cement; one gram of calcium aluminate cement can neutralize around 40% more acid than a gram of ordinary Portland Cement. For a given production of acid by the biofilm, a calcium aluminate cement concrete will last longer.
 The second barrier is due to the precipitation, when the surficial pH gets below 10, of a layer of alumina gel (AH3 in cement chemistry notation). AH3 is a stable compound down to a pH of 4 and it will form an acid-resistant barrier as long as the surface pH is not lowered below 3-4 by the bacterial activity.
 The third barrier is the bacteriostatic effect locally activated when the surface reaches pH values less than 3–4. At this level, the alumina gel is no longer stable and will dissolve, liberating aluminum ions. These ions will accumulate in the thin biofilm. Once the concentration reaches 300-500 ppm, it will produce a bacteriostatic effect on bacteria metabolism. In other word, bacteria will stop oxidizing the sulfur from H2S to produce acid, and the pH will stop decreasing.
A mortar made of calcium aluminate cement combined with
calcium aluminate aggregates, i.e. a 100% calcium aluminate material, will last much longer as aggregates can also limit microorganisms’ growth and inhibits the acid generation at the source itself.

Prevention
There are several options to address biogenic sulfide corrosion problems: impairing H2S formation, venting out the H2S or using materials resistant to biogenic corrosion. For example, sewage flows more rapidly through steeper gradient sewers reducing time available for hydrogen sulfide generation. Likewise, removing sludge and sediments from the bottom of the pipes reduces the amount of anoxic areas responsible for sulfate reducing bacteria growth. Providing good ventilation of sewers can reduce atmospheric concentrations of hydrogen sulfide gas and may dry exposed sewer crowns, but this may create odor issues with neighbors around the venting shafts. Three other efficient methods can be used involving continuous operation of mechanical equipment: chemical reactant like calcium nitrate can be continuously added in the sewerage water to impair the H2S formation, an active ventilation through odor treatment units to remove H2S, or an injection of compressed air in pressurized mains to avoid the anaerobic condition to develop. In sewerage areas where biogenic sulfide corrosion is expected, acid resistant materials like calcium aluminate cements, PVC or vitrified clay pipe may be substituted to ordinary concrete or steel sewers. 
Existing structures that have extensive exposure to biogenic corrosion such as sewer manholes and pump station wet wells can be rehabilitated.  Rehabilitation can be done with materials such as a structural epoxy coating, this epoxy is designed to be both acid resistant and strengthen the compromised concrete structure.

See also
 Corrosion
 Microbial corrosion
 Sulfide

References
 Brongers, M.P.H., Virmani, P.Y., Payer, J.H., 2002. Drinking Water and Sewer Systems in Corrosion Costs and preventive Strategies in the United States. United States Department of Transportation Federal Highway Administration.
 Sydney, R., Esfandi, E., Surapaneni, S., 1996. Control concrete sewer corrosion via the crown spray process. Water Environ. Res. 68 (3), 338–347.
 United States Environmental Protection Agency, 1991. Hydrogen Sulphide Corrosion in Wastewater Collection and Treatment Systems (Technical Report).
 United States Environmental Protection Agency (1985) Design Manual, Odor and Corrosion Control in Sanitary Sewerage Systems and Treatment Plants (Technical Report).
 Morton R.L., Yanko W.A., Grahom D.W., Arnold R.G. (1991) Relationship between metal concentrations and crown corrosion in Los Angeles County sewers. Research Journal of Water Pollution Control Federation, 63, 789–798.
 Mori T., Nonaka T., Tazaki K., Koga M., Hikosaka Y., Noda S. (1992) Interactions of nutrients, moisture, and pH on microbial corrosion of concrete sewer pipes. Water Research, 26, 29–37.
 Ismail N., Nonaka T., Noda S., Mori T. (1993) Effect of carbonation on microbial corrosion of concrete. Journal of Construction Management and Engineering, 20, 133–138.
 Davis J.L. (1998) Characterization and modeling of microbially induced corrosion of concrete sewer pipes. Ph.D. Dissertation, University of Houston, Houston, TX.
 Monteny J., De Belie N., Vincke E., Verstraete W., Taerwe L. (2001) Chemical and microbiological tests to simulate sulfuric acid corrosion of polymer-modified concrete. Cement and Concrete Research, 31, 1359–1365.
 Vincke E., Van Wanseele E., Monteny J., Beeldens A., De Belie N., Taerwe L., Van Gemert D., Verstraete W. (2002) Influence of polymer addition on biogenic sulfuric acid attack. International Biodeterioration and Biodegradation, 49, 283–292.
 Herisson J., Van Hullebusch E., Gueguen Minerbe M., Chaussadent T. (2014) Biogenic corrosion mechanism: study of parameters explaining calcium aluminate cement durability. CAC 2014 – International Conference on Calcium Aluminates, May 2014, France. 12 p.
 Hammer, Mark J. Water and Waste-Water Technology John Wiley & Sons (1975) 
 Metcalf & Eddy Wastewater Engineering McGraw-Hill (1972)
 Pomeroy, R.D., 1976, "The problem of hydrogen sulphide in sewers". Published by the Clay Pipes Development Association
 Sawyer, Clair N. & McCarty, Perry L. Chemistry for Sanitary Engineers (2nd edition) McGraw-Hill (1967) 
 United States Department of the Interior (USDI) Concrete Manual (8th edition) United States Government Printing Office (1975)
 Weismann, D. & Lohse, M. (Hrsg.): "Sulfid-Praxishandbuch der Abwassertechnik; Geruch, Gefahr, Korrosion verhindern und Kosten beherrschen!" 1. Auflage, VULKAN-Verlag, 2007,

Notes

Pomeroy's report contains errors in the equation: the pipeline slope (S, p. 8) is quoted as m/100m, but should be m/m. This introduces a factor of 10 underestimate in the calculation of the 'Z factor', used to indicate if there is a risk of sulphide-induced corrosion, if the published units are used. The web link is to the revised 1992 edition, which contains the units error - the 1976 edition has the correct units.

Sewerage
Bacteria
Cement
Concrete
Corrosion